Émile Gaboriau (9 November 183228 September 1873) was a French writer, novelist, journalist, and a pioneer of detective fiction.

Early life 
Gaboriau was born in the small town of Saujon, Charente-Maritime. He was the son of Charles Gabriel Gaboriau, a public official and his mother was Marguerite Stéphanie Gaboriau. Gaboriau became a secretary to Paul Féval, and after publishing some novels and miscellaneous writings, found his real gift in L'Affaire Lerouge (1866).

Literary life 
Gaboriau's novel L'Affaire Lerouge is widely considered as the first detective story in France. Its structure is characterized as a flashback into the past that serves to inform a present mystery.  Influenced by Baudelaire's translations of the stories of Edgar Allan Poe, this work introduced an amateur detective and a young police officer named Monsieur Lecoq, who was the hero in three of Gaboriau's later detective novels. The character of Lecoq was based on a real-life thief turned police officer, Eugène François Vidocq (1775–1857), whose own memoirs, Les Vrais Mémoires de Vidocq, mixed fiction and fact.  It may also have been influenced by the villainous Monsieur Lecoq, one of the main protagonists of Féval's Les Habits Noirs book series. Gaboriau was likely influenced also by the philosophy of positivism, promoted by Auguste Comte, which promoted the idea that science could answer all questions. Gaboriau's investigators rely heavily on newly developing scientific methodologies in their pursuit of criminals rather than simply on interrogation and eyewitnesses.

L'Affaire Lerouge was published as a series in the daily Le Soleil and at once made his reputation. Its recounting of a reclusive woman who is murdered for the secret she hides gained for Gaboriau a huge following. But when Arthur Conan Doyle created Sherlock Holmes, Monsieur Lecoq's international fame declined. The story was produced on the stage in 1872. A long series of novels dealing with the annals of the police court followed, and proved very popular. Gaboriau died in Paris of pulmonary apoplexy.

Gaboriau's books were generally well received. About The Mystery of the Orcival, Harper's wrote in 1872: "Of its class of romance—French sensational—this is a remarkable and unique specimen".
A film version of Le Dossier n° 113 (File No. 113) was released in 1932.

In A Study in Scarlet, Arthur Conan Doyle has Watson ask Sherlock Holmes what he thinks of Gaboriau's work. Holmes disparages Lecoq as "a miserable bungler".

Fiction

Series

Mariages d'aventure
Monsieur J.-D. de Saint-Roch, ambassadeur matrimonial – The Matrimonial Ambassador: Monsieur J. D. de Saint-Roch (1862)
Promesses de mariage – Promises of Marriage (1862)

Lecoq & Others
 L'Affaire Lerouge (1866) – The Widow Lerouge / The Lerouge Affair
 Le Crime d'Orcival (1867) –  The Mystery of Orcival
 Le Dossier n° 113 (1867) – Dossier No. 113 / File No. 113 / The Blackmailers translated by Fred Williams
 Les Esclaves de Paris (1868, 2 vol.) – Slaves of Paris (Le Chantage – Caught in the Net) and (Le Secret de la Maison de Champdoce – The Champdoce Mystery)
 Monsieur Lecoq (1869, 2 vol. – L'Enquête – The Inquiry / Monsieur Lecoq / The Detective's Dilemma) and ( L'Honneur du nom – The Honor of the Name / The Detective's Triumph)
 La Vie infernale (1870, 2 vol.) – The Count's Millions (Pascal et Marguerite – The Count's Millions) and (Lia d'Argeles – Baron Trigault's Vengeance)
 La Clique dorée (1871) – The Clique of Gold / The Gilded Clique
 La Dégringolade (1872) – Catastrophe / The Downward Path
 La Corde au cou (1873) – Rope Around His Neck / In Peril of His Life / In Deadly Peril
 L'Argent des autres (1874) – Other People's Money / A Great Robbery
 Une Disparition (1876) – A Disappearance / Missing! / 1000 Francs Reward

Non-Series
 Le treizième Hussards (1861) – The 13th Hussars
 Les Gens de Bureau (1862) – The Men of the Bureau
 Les comédiennes adorées (1863)
 Le Petit Vieux des Batignolles (1876) – The Little Old Man of Batignolles
 Le Capitaine Coutanceau (1878) – Captain Coutanceau
 Maudite maison (1876) – The Unfortunate House
 Casta vixit (1876) – Love, the Conqueror
 Amours d'une empoisonneuse (1881) – Intrigues of a Poisoner / An Adventuress of France / The Marquise De Brinvilliers

Filmography
Monsieur Lecoq, directed by Maurice Tourneur (1914, based on the novel Monsieur Lecoq)
L'Affaire d'Orcival, directed by Gérard Bourgeois (1914, based on the novel Le Crime d'Orcival)
 (1915, based on the novel Monsieur Lecoq), with William Morris as Lecoq
, directed by Will S. Davis (1915, based on the novel L'Affaire Lerouge)
The Evil Women Do, directed by Rupert Julian (1916, based on the novel La Clique dorée)
Le Capitaine noir, directed by Gérard Bourgeois (1917)
Thou Shalt Not Steal, directed by William Nigh (1917, based on the novel Le Dossier n° 113)
File 113, directed by Chester M. Franklin (1933, based on the novel Le Dossier n° 113), with Lew Cody as Lecoq
La Corde au cou, directed by Marcel Moussy (TV miniseries, 1978, based on the novel La Corde au cou)

References

External links 

 
 
 
 Online editions of his works 
 Émile Gaboriau – Bibliographie complète sur Roman-Feuilleton & HARD-BOILED site (Comprehensive Bibliographies by Vladimir Matuschenko)

1832 births
1873 deaths
People from Charente-Maritime
French crime fiction writers
Writers from Nouvelle-Aquitaine
19th-century French novelists
French male novelists
19th-century French male writers